Jack Wolfskin is a German producer of outdoor wear and equipment headquartered in Idstein. It was founded in 1981 and is now one of the biggest suppliers and successful franchisers of outdoor products including sports equipment, mountain ,leisure clothing, footwear, rucksacks, sleeping bags, and tents.

Skyrager GmbH, which also has its registered address in Idstein, is the general partner of the Partnership, limited by shares (KGAA).

History
Jack Wolfskin was founded as a trademark of the company Sine in Frankfurt am Main by Ulrich Dausien in 1981. With proceeding success Jack Wolfskin was incorporated separately from Sine. In 1991, the company was sold to Johnson Outdoors. Jack Wolfskin had supplied only specialist shops until the first own shop was opened in Heidelberg in 1993. As of mid-2012 there were more than 600, mostly franchised, Jack Wolfskin stores worldwide.

In 2002 Bain Capital acquired Jack Wolfskin from Johnson Outdoors for 42 million Euros. Bain sold it to Quadriga Capital and Barclays Private Equity in 2005 for 93 million Euro. Jack Wolfskin was then sold to Blackstone Group in 2011. Blackstone is expected to help Jack Wolfskin to grow further on an international level. Simultaneously the former CEO and co-owner Manfred Hell left the company with immediate effect, after 25 years at the top of the company. In November 2014, Melody Harris-Jensbach was selected as CEO of the company.

In July 6, 2017, Jack Wolfskin has successfully completed a financial restructuring with its main creditors and reduced its debt by 225 million euros ($256m), it announced on Thursday. The move has brought down its debt from 365 million euros to 110 million euros, with terms extended until 2022. Additionally, the clothing firm will receive a new temporary loan of 25 million euros ($28m) from current senior creditors, who will become new shareholders of the company as a result of the restructuring process. Jack Wolfskin’s new owners will hold their stake via a Luxemburg-based holding company. These include Bain Capital Credit, HIG / Bayside Capital and CQS, who now own more than 50% of the brand.

Reports announced in April that private equity firm Blackstone had handed over control of the German company to a group of its lenders in a debt for equity swap.

On 30 November 2018, Jack Wolfskin announced they were to be purchased by Callaway Golf Company (currently renamed Topgolf Callaway Brands). On 4 January 2019, Callaway completed the acquisition of Jack Wolfskin for €418 million.

On 23 November 2020, Jack Wolfskin announced that Richard Collier will be the new Chief Executive Officer of Jack Wolfskin, effective December 1, 2020.

In 2022, researchers from Nordhausen University of Applied Sciences identified cotton from Xinjiang in Jack Wolfskin shirts.

Corporate responsibility 

Since July 2010, Jack Wolfskin has been a member of the Fair Wear Foundation, a multi-stakeholder initiative working to improve workplace conditions in the garment and textile industry. 
In July 2007, Jack Wolfskin became patron of the I.C.E. Youth Camp a UNEP-initiative which has the aim to train young persons an environmentally awareness and a thrifty use of resources in cooperation with Arved Fuchs.

Since 2008, a supplier monitoring was established at Jack Wolfskin and in 2009, Jack Wolfskin announced that a membership in a multi-stakeholder initiative will be checked. When the Clean Clothes Campaign distributed questionnaires about working and production conditions to several outdoor producers in 2009 and 2010, Jack Wolfskin decided to become a member of the FWF as there were many similarities to the own established social audit system. Together with Wolfgang Niedecken and World Vision Germany the project "Rebound" was initiated in 2008. The aim of the project is to improve life conditions of former child soldiers in Uganda and to reintegrate them into society. In 2010, the Swiss NGO Erklärung von Bern compared working condition standards in countries of production of 77 fashion brands. Jack Wolfskin was graded into the "average" category, the second best of five categories.

Litigation

Jack Wolfskin has a history of aggressive legal action related to its paw print logo. In 2002, it succeeded in prohibiting the taz newspaper from using a paw print design on merchandise designed for outdoor use on the grounds that the taz logo designed in 1978 was not registered as a trademark, whereas the Jack Wolfskin logo was registered in 1982. This led to many people boycotting its products.

In October 2009, Jack Wolfskin's lawyers sent demands for damage payments to handicraft hobbyists who had used paw designs in their creations, irrespective of whether the paw design was of wolf, cat or other animal. This prompted a backlash in online forums for handicrafts and bloggers documenting corporate behaviour,  outraged at the bullying tactics used by a large firm against individual hobbyists with barely measurable income through clothing and no intention to mimic Jack Wolfskin goods. The protest reached national news media in Germany. A blunt refusal to back down by Jack Wolfskin led to calls to boycott their products in several online communities in Germany and abroad. As the impact of the negative publicity became apparent Jack Wolfskin later issued a press release to indicate they would in future open dialog directly with people it suspected of breaching its copyright, rather than sending damage payment demands as the first contact.

In November 2009, Jack Wolfskin threatened the Dutch company Bearwear, a clothing supplier to the gay bear scene, with legal action causing it to suspend its European web shop and generating ill-feelings to Wolfskin with its customers. This was eventually resolved, allowing Bearwear to continue trading with its logo that incorporates a bear paw print.

On 19 December 2011, the Civic Association Dog Soul from Slovak Republic (a non-profit organization) received an e-mail with a copy of a letter from an attorney and patent office representing the JACK WOLFSKIN Ausrüstung für Draussen GmbH & Co. KGaA company. Simultaneously - without any valid court decision - they directly accused them of violating trademark property rights.

Sponsorship 
In August 2010, Jack Wolfskin signed a 3-year deal to sponsor the English football club Liverpool FC, in a chance to increase its exposure in the UK. In April 2013, Liverpool FC and Jack Wolfskin announced a 3-year extension of their current partnership deal.

References

External links

 
 US Official Site

Clothing brands of Germany
Outdoor clothing brands
Camping equipment manufacturers
Companies based in Hesse
Clothing companies established in 1981
Manufacturing companies established in 1981
1981 establishments in Germany
German brands
2019 mergers and acquisitions